The U23 Women's scratch was one of the 8 women's under-23 events at the 2008 European Track Championships, held in Pruszków, Poland. It took place on 7 September 2008. 23 cyclists were on the start list and 22 participated in the race.

Competition format
A scratch race is a race in which all riders start together and the object is simply to be first over the finish line after a certain number of laps. There are no intermediate points or sprints.

Schedule
Sunday 7 September
10:55-11:20 Qualifying
14:50-15:05 Final
15:15-15:25 Victory Ceremony

Source

Final results

i) There were awarded 2 gold medals because Ellen van Dijk and Lizzie Armitstead finished at the same time. See the finishfoto.

SourcesScratch Race Results

See also

 2008 European Track Championships – U23 Women's individual pursuit
 2008 European Track Championships – U23 Women's points race

References

2008 European Track Championships
European Track Championships – U23 Women's scratch